Marlos Moreno Durán (born 20 September 1996) is a Colombian professional footballer who plays for French side Troyes as a forward.

Moreno began his career with Atlético Nacional before joining Premier League side Manchester City for £4.75 million in 2016. During a six-year spell with City he failed to make a first team appearance and was never selected for a matchday squad, instead spending his tenure in with the Blues on loan at Deportivo La Coruña, Girona, Flamengo, Santos Laguna, Portimonense, Lommel and Kortrijk.

He has been capped eight times by Colombia but has not been selected for a national squad since 2016.

Club career

Atlético Nacional
Born in Medellín, Moreno joined Atlético Nacional's youth setup in 2010, aged 14. On 23 July 2014, he made his first team debut, coming on as a second-half substitute for Rodin Quiñónes in a 3–1 Copa Colombia away win against Rionegro Águilas.

Moreno made his Categoría Primera A debut on 15 October 2014, starting in a 2–1 loss at Deportivo Pasto. He scored his first professional goal on 10 September of the following year, netting the second in a 3–0 home win against Deportivo Cali.

On 17 October 2015, Moreno scored a brace in a 4–0 away routing of Atlético Junior. He also started in the season's final against the same team, scoring from 30 seconds and helping his team to win its first title of the year; it was also the fastest goal of the club's history.

Manchester City
On 6 August 2016, Moreno signed for Manchester City for £4.75 million and was immediately loaned out to Deportivo de La Coruña, in a season-long deal.

Loan to Deportivo
Moreno made his debut for Deportivo on 11 September, in a 1–0 loss to Athletic Bilbao.

Loan to Girona
Moreno was loaned to La Liga side Girona FC for the first half of the 2017–18 season.

Loan to Flamengo
On 12 January 2018, Moreno was loaned out to Brazilian Série A club Flamengo until 31 December 2018.

Loan to Santos Laguna
On 25 January 2019, Moreno was loaned to Mexican side Santos Laguna.

Loan to Portimonense 
On 31 July 2019, Moreno was loaned to Portuguese Primeira Liga club Portimonense on a one-year deal.

Loan to Lommel
Moreno was loaned to Lommel, another club owned by the City Football Group, for the 2020–21 season.

Loan to Kortrijk
Moreno was loaned to Belgian side Kortrijk for the 2021–22 season.

Troyes
After spending six years at Manchester City without making an appearance, Moreno signed a two-year contract with fellow City Football Group club Troyes on 1 September 2022.

International career
After representing Colombia at under-17 level, Moreno was called up to the main squad on 11 February 2016. He made his full international debut on 24 March, coming on as 85th-minute substitute for Juan Cuadrado and setting up Edwin Cardona's last-minute winner. On 11 June 2016, Moreno scored his first international goal against Costa Rica in the Copa America Centenario.

Career statistics

Club

Note

International

International goals
As of match played 11 June 2016. Colombia score listed first, score column indicates score after each Moreno goal.

Honours

Club
Atlético Nacional
Categoría Primera A: 2015–II
Superliga Colombiana: 2016
Copa Libertadores: 2016

International
Colombia
Copa América: third place 2016

Notes

References

External links

1996 births
Footballers from Medellín
Colombian people of African descent
Living people
Association football forwards
Colombian footballers
Colombia youth international footballers
Colombia international footballers
Atlético Nacional footballers
Manchester City F.C. players
Deportivo de La Coruña players
Girona FC players
CR Flamengo footballers
Santos Laguna footballers
Portimonense S.C. players
Lommel S.K. players
K.V. Kortrijk players
ES Troyes AC players

Categoría Primera A players
La Liga players
Campeonato Brasileiro Série A players
Liga MX players
Primeira Liga players
Challenger Pro League players
Belgian Pro League players
Copa América Centenario players
Colombian expatriate footballers
Expatriate footballers in England
Colombian expatriate sportspeople in England
Expatriate footballers in Spain
Colombian expatriate sportspeople in Spain
Expatriate footballers in Brazil
Colombian expatriate sportspeople in Brazil
Expatriate footballers in Mexico
Colombian expatriate sportspeople in Mexico
Expatriate footballers in Portugal
Colombian expatriate sportspeople in Portugal
Expatriate footballers in Belgium
Colombian expatriate sportspeople in Belgium
Expatriate footballers in France
Colombian expatriate sportspeople in France